The men's 100 metres at the 2010 World Junior Championships in Athletics was held at the Moncton 2010 Stadium on 20 & 21 July.

Medalists

Records
Prior to the competition, the existing world junior and championship records were as follows.

No new records were established during the competition.

Results

Final
21 July
Wind: -0.7 m/s

Key:  PB = Personal best, SB = Seasonal best

Semifinals
21 July

Qual. rule: first 2 of each heat (Q) plus the 2 fastest times (q) qualified.

Semifinal 1
Wind: +2.6 m/s

Semifinal 2
Wind: +2.2 m/s

Semifinal 3
Wind: +0.9 m/s

Heats
20 July

Heat 1
Wind: +2.2 m/s

Heat 2
Wind: +1.3 m/s

Heat 3
Wind: +0.8 m/s

Heat 4
Wind: +0.4 m/s

Heat 5
Wind: +1.0 m/s

Heat 6
Wind: +0.2 m/s

Heat 7
Wind: +1.3 m/s

Heat 8
Wind: +1.3 m/s

Participation
According to an unofficial count, 57 athletes from 46 countries participated in the event.

References

External links
13th IAAF World Junior Championships Facts & Figures. IAAF. Retrieved on 2010-07-21.

100 metres
100 metres at the World Athletics U20 Championships